Al Sharnamah al-Allia is a sub-district located in al-Nadirah District, Ibb Governorate, Yemen. Al Sharnamah al-Allia had a population of 8800 according to the 2004 census.

References 

Sub-districts in An Nadirah District